The purplish dtella (Gehyra purpurascens) is a species of gecko endemic to Australia.

References

Gehyra
Reptiles described in 1982
Geckos of Australia